Mika Juhani Strömberg (born February 28, 1970 in Helsinki, Finland) is a Finnish professional ice hockey defenceman. He was drafted by the Quebec Nordiques as their eleventh-round pick, #211 overall, in the 1990 NHL Entry Draft.

After a ten-year career with Jokerit, he spent three years in Switzerland, with HC Fribourg-Gottéron and EHC Chur. After coming back to Jokerit for one season Strömberg again went overseas, this time to Stockholm and the Djurgårdens IF in the Swedish Elitserien. For the 2006–07 season Strömberg returned to Finland to play for HPK. After his single season for HPK, Strömberg was first contracted by KalPa and then he was bought mid-07/08 season to Jokerit. After the 07/08 season, Strömberg returned to KalPa.

Awards and achievements
 Pekka Rautakallio trophy for best defenceman in the SM-liiga - 1996
 SM-liiga championship four times with Jokerit: 1992, 1994, 1996 and 1997.
 Gold medal at the 1995 Ice Hockey World Championships; Finland's first IIHF gold medal.

Records
 Jokerit franchise record for most all-time points, goals, and assists by a defenceman.

Career statistics

Regular season and playoffs

International

References

External links
 
 

1970 births
Living people
Djurgårdens IF Hockey players
Finnish ice hockey defencemen
Finnish ice hockey world championship gold medalists
HPK players
Ice hockey players at the 1994 Winter Olympics
Jokerit players
Medalists at the 1994 Winter Olympics
Olympic bronze medalists for Finland
Olympic ice hockey players of Finland
Olympic medalists in ice hockey
Quebec Nordiques draft picks
Ice hockey people from Helsinki